Lone Star is an unincorporated community in Calhoun County, South Carolina, United States. The community has the ZIP Code of 29030 and lies at approximately 33.63 latitude and -80.59 longitude, with an elevation of 171 feet. It is part of the Columbia, South Carolina Metropolitan Statistical Area.

South Carolina Highway 33 runs between Lone Star and Orangeburg.

References

HomeTownLocator.com: Lone Star, South Carolina
HomeTownLocator.com: Populated Places in Calhoun County

Unincorporated communities in South Carolina
Unincorporated communities in Calhoun County, South Carolina
Columbia metropolitan area (South Carolina)